Xuanhua railway station is a railway station on the Beijing–Baotou railway,  and Xuanyan railway. The station is located in Zhangjiakou, Hebei.

History
The station opened as Xuanhuafu station in 1909. Xuanhuafu station was renamed Xuanhua station in 1914.

See also
List of stations on Jingbao railway
Xuanhua North railway station

References

Railway stations in Hebei
Railway stations in China opened in 1909
Xuanhua